The Engelberg Huller Company was established in 1888 in Syracuse, New York, by John R. Montague, to manufacture and distribute the Engelberg Huller machine which was invented by Brazilian mechanical engineer and inventor, Evaristo Conrado Engelberg, and Willard Halstead to remove the husks and shells from rice and coffee during the milling process.

The Engelberg Huller Company was sold to an agricultural equipment manufacturer located in Nicholson, Pennsylvania, in 1976.  The CEO and owner in 1976 was James Solon. Engelberg Huller Co., INC is still operating a manufacturing plant in Nicholson, PA, exporting Engelberg spare parts and equipment.

References

External links
The Engelberg Huller
Preparing Green Coffee for Marketing -A Coffee Chronology
OWWM – Engelberg, Inc. – Assigned Patents
OWWM – Engelberg, Inc. – Assigned Patents
Patents for Engelberg Huller Co. – Directory of American Tool and Machinery Patents, 2002
U.S. Federal Trademark Registration 1905 – Engelberg Huller Co. – Logos Database, 2011

Defunct companies based in Syracuse, New York
Manufacturing companies established in 1888
Manufacturing companies disestablished in 1976
1888 establishments in New York (state)
1976 disestablishments in New York (state)
American companies disestablished in 1976